Remaster refers to quality enhancement of sound and/or picture of a previously existing recording.

Remastering may also refer to:
Software remastering, the process of customizing a software or operating system distribution for personal or "off-label" usage
Mastering (audio), a form of audio post-production

See also
 List of remastering software